The 1968–69 NCAA College Division men's ice hockey season began in November 1968 and concluded in March of the following year. This was the 5th season of second-tier college ice hockey.

Regular season

Season tournaments

Standings

See also
 1968–69 NCAA University Division men's ice hockey season

References

External links

 
NCAA